The Battle of Mount Scorobas was a battle fought in 88 BC between the Roman Republic and Pontus during the First Mithridatic War. The Romans were led by Manius Aquilius, while the Mithridatic forces were led by Archelaus. Pontus was victorious.

After the battle, M. Aquillius fled and attempted to make his way back to Roman Italy. At Lesbos he was captured and delivered to Mithridates. After being taken to the mainland, Aquillius was then placed on a donkey and paraded back to Pergamon. Aquillius was then moved to and executed at the Theater of Dionysus, which sits on a hill of the Acropolis. A large bonfire was made in the center of the theater. Aquillius was dragged behind a horse, which was ridden by a soldier, and dragged around the bonfire, as gold coins were melted down in crucibles. Aquillius was then held down and the molten hot gold was poured down his throat for an agonizing death.

References 

88 BC
80s BC conflicts
1st century BC in the Roman Republic
Scorobos
Scorobos
Mount Scorobas